Trond Fausa Aurvåg (born 2 December 1972) is a Norwegian actor, film director, and poet.

After graduating from the Norwegian National Academy of Theatre in 2001, he has acted at Oslo Nye Teater since 2001. Here he has acted in plays such as Amadeus, Manndomsprøven and Tatt av kvinnen. As a film actor he is best known for his leading roles in the films Andreaskorset (2004) and Den brysomme mannen (2006). He has also starred in the music video for Lemaitre's song "We Got U".

He won two Amandas—the main Norwegian film award—in 2006, for best actor for his role in Den brysomme mannen, and for the short film Alene menn sammen, which he directed. He gained some international attention co-starring with Steven Van Zandt in the TV series Lilyhammer, playing Van Zandt's partner in crime. For this role he won the Gullruten Award in 2014 for best actor. He will be part of Christopher Nolans next movie Oppenheimer to premiere this summer portraying the ukrainian scientist George Kistiakowsky.

Aurvåg lives with his wife, actress Lena Kristin Ellingsen, in Oslo.

Select filmography
 Budbringeren (1997)
 1732 Høtten (1998)
 Nissene på låven (TV, 2001)
 Andreaskorset (2004)
 Den brysomme mannen (2006)
 Tatt av kvinnen (2007)
 Home for Christmas (2010)
 Lilyhammer (2012)
 Neste Sommer (2014)
 Thin Ice (2017)
 Norsemen (2017)
 The Innocents (2018)
 Stjernestøv (TV, 2020)
 The Middle Man (2021)
 Oppenheimer (2023)

References

External links

Trond Fausa at Instagram

1972 births
Living people
People from Fet
Norwegian male stage actors
Oslo National Academy of the Arts alumni
Norwegian film directors
Norwegian male poets
Norwegian male film actors